The Khovd Gol mine (Khovd River) is an underground mine located in the Tsengel sum of Khovd aimag in western Mongolia.

The reserves of the deposit are estimated at 26,300 tonnes of tungsten at an ore concentration of 5-19.3%.

References 

Tungsten mines in Mongolia
Underground mines in Mongolia